The tournament in Xi'an is a new addition to the ITF Women's Circuit.

Fourth seed Duan Yingying won the title, defeating wildcard Zhu Lin in the final, 4–6, 7–6(11–9), 6–4.

Seeds

Main draw

Finals

Top half

Bottom half

References 
 Main draw

Xi'an - Singles